John Sheldon Collier (September 26, 1907 – October 31, 1984) was an American athlete who competed mainly in the 110 metre hurdles.

Born in Buffalo, New York, he competed for the United States in the 1928 Summer Olympics held in Amsterdam, Netherlands in the 110 metre hurdles where he won the bronze medal.

References

American male hurdlers
Olympic bronze medalists for the United States in track and field
Athletes (track and field) at the 1928 Summer Olympics
1907 births
1984 deaths
Medalists at the 1928 Summer Olympics
Track and field athletes from Buffalo, New York